Steve Berrios (February 24, 1945 – July 25, 2013) was an American jazz drummer and percussionist born in New York City.

Biography
Starting out on trumpet while in public school, he was influenced by his father, a professional drummer, and his neighbors in Upper Manhattan: Tito Puente, Willie Bobo and Mongo Santamaria. At 16, he began winning talent and trumpet contests, including the famed Apollo Theatre competitions, in which he placed first no less than five times. Switching his focus to drums and percussion, he started touring and recording with Mongo Santamaria at age 19.

He learned to play batá sacred drums from Julito Collazo. He played conga, djembe, cowbells, marimba, timpani and glockenspiel in Dizzy Gillespie’s band on a good-will tour of Cuba in the 1980s. In 1981, he became a founding member of the milestone Latin jazz group “Jerry González & the Fort Apache Band”. Berrios recorded more than a dozen albums as a member of the Fort Apache Band, including “The River Is Deep” (1982), “Obatala” (1988), “Rumba Para Monk” (1988) “Earthdance” (1990) and “Moliendo Café” (1991). He was also in Max Roach's “M'Boom”, a percussion group that Roach created.

He also led his own group, “Son Bacheche”. “And Then Some!” (1997), one of the few albums he recorded at the head of his own group, was nominated for a Grammy for Best Latin Jazz Performance.

Steve Berrios also played and recorded with artists such as Kenny Kirkland, Art Blakey, Tito Puente, Paquito D’Rivera, Pucho & His Latin Soul Brothers, Michael Brecker, Grover Washington, Hilton Ruiz and Miriam Makeba.

Discography

As leader
And Then Some (Milestone Records, 1996)

As sideman
With Jasmine - featuring Bill O'Connell, Carmen Lundy
Jasmine (West 54 Records)
With Michael Brecker
Now You See It… (Now You Don't)  (GRP, 1990)
With Sonny Fortune
A Better Understanding (Blue Note, 1995)
With The Harlem Experiment
The Harlem Experiment  (Ropeadope, 2007)
With Alphonse Mouzon
Funky Snakefoot (Blue Note, 1973)
With Wallace Roney
The Standard Bearer (Muse, 1989)
Mistérios (Warner Bros., 1994)
Village (Warner Bros., 1997)
With Roseanna Vitro
Reaching for the Moon (Chase Music Group, 1991)
With Randy Weston
Carnival (Freedom, 1974)
With Larry Willis
Sunshower (Mapleshade, 2001)

References

External links
 National Public Radio Blog
 New York Times article

1945 births
2013 deaths
Afro-Cuban jazz drummers
Afro-Cuban jazz percussionists
American people of Puerto Rican descent
Latin jazz percussionists
Latin jazz drummers
American jazz drummers
Afro Blue Band members
M'Boom members